Who Killed Nancy?  is a British documentary film directed by Alan G. Parker. The film was produced by Ben Timlett and Christine Alderson. It had its US theatrical opening at the Cinema Village in New York City on 30 July 2010. The film examines the possibility that it was not Sid Vicious who was responsible for the death of Nancy Spungen.

Interviews
Glen Matlock
Don Letts
Steve Dior
John Holmstrom
Howie Pyro
Edward Tudor-Pole
Viv Albertine
Keith Levene
Malcolm McLaren (archival footage)
Rockets Redglare (archival footage)
Eliot Kidd (archival footage)
Alan Jones
Peter "Kodick" Gravelle
Steve "Roadent" Connolly
Steve English
Kris Needs
John "Boogie" Tiberi
Simone Stenfors
Alan G. Parker
Steve Walsh
Kenny "Stinker" Gordon
Sturgis Nikides
George X
Eileen Polk
Leee Black Childers

Soundtrack
The following songs are featured in the film.
 Terrorvision - When I Die
 Buzzcocks - Sick City Sometimes
 Steve Diggle - Lie in Bed
 Ricky Warwick - Tattoos and Alibis
 Steve Diggle - Early Grave
 Ricky Warwick - Three Sides to Every Story
 Buzzcocks - Sell You Everything
 Steve Diggle - Terminal
 Neon Leon - Fast Track to Hell
 Steve Diggle - Wallpaper World
 Sid Vicious & the Idols - Chinese Rocks
 Pizzo & the Delinquents - Pretty Dope Friend
 Buzzcocks - Wake Up Call
 Buzzcocks - Up for the Crack
 The London Cowboys - Hollywood
 Steve Diggle - Time of Your Life
 Steve Dior - Who Killed Nancy? (theme)
 The London Cowboys - Overloaded
 Buzzcocks - Driving You Insane
 The London Cowboys - Overrated
 Buzzcocks - Soul Survivor

References

External links

ComingSoon.net
Yahoo! Movies
IMP Awards

2009 films
British documentary films
Documentary films about conspiracy theories
Documentary films about punk music and musicians
Documentary films about crime
Sex Pistols
2009 documentary films
2000s English-language films
2000s British films